Trailer may refer to:

Transportation
 Trailer (vehicle), an unpowered vehicle pulled by a powered vehicle
 Baggage trailer, a large flatbed baggage trolley
 Bicycle trailer, a wheeled frame for hitching to a bicycle to tow cargo or passengers
 Boat trailer to carry small boats
 Horse trailer and other trailers designed to haul livestock
 Semi-trailer, a trailer without a front axle
 Travel trailer, or caravan, a type of recreational trailer designed to provide sleeping space
 Semi-trailer truck, the combination of a tractor unit and one or more semi-trailers

Shelter
 Mobile home, a relocatable housing unit with wheels and a hitch.
 Portable classroom, a temporary classroom for schools with insufficient building capacity - not technically a trailer due to lack of wheels or hitch. This temporary shelter can be relocated with a trailer, but by definition, the structure itself is not a trailer.
 Construction trailer, relocatable temporary accommodation with wheels and hitch used for offices and building materials storage on construction sites.

Computing
 Trailer (computing), data appended to a main block of data to facilitate its processing

Multimedia
 Trailer (promotion), an advertisement, usually in the form of a brief excerpt or string of excerpts, for media work
 Teaser trailer, a truncated version of a trailer meant to "tease" an upcoming work

Music
 Trailer (album), a 1994 album from the Northern Irish musical group Ash
Tráiler, 2018 extended play by Spanish singer Aitana